Claude Pettit College of Law is the law school of Ohio Northern University. Located in Ada, Ohio, it is the second oldest law school in Ohio, having been founded in 1885. The college is centered in Tilton Hall, which houses all law classes and the Taggart Law Library.  The College of Law is located on the east-northeast side of the ONU campus.

History
Founded in 1885, the Ohio Northern University Pettit College of Law is the second oldest of the nine Ohio law schools and a founding member of the Ohio League of Law Schools.  As such, it is one of the oldest law schools in the United States.   It was named in honor of Claude W. Pettit, a judge and former dean of the college. ONU Law has been fully accredited by the American Bar Association since 1948 and a member of the Association of American Law Schools since 1965.

Academics

The ONU College of Law is accredited by the American Bar Association and is a member of the Association of American Law Schools. In 2019, the law school was ranked 136 of 205 law schools by the U.S. News & World Report. The College's 2019 acceptance rate was 38.07% with the average student having a 151 LSAT score and average GPA of 3.31, with 90% of students receiving some form of grant, the average grant being $20,000.

Curriculum 
ONU law students can choose from nine specialized tracks, 12 guaranteed clinical and externship placements and more than 100+ course options while also expanding their experience by studying abroad, participating in Law Review, accepting research and teaching assistantships, participating in pro bono programs or taking an active role in Moot Court. ONU Law is regarded for its ability to blend legal theory with practical training.

Bar Passage Rate 
ONU's bar passage rate for first-time takers of the July 2019 Ohio Bar Examination was 100%, while its bar passage rate for first-time takers in any jurisdiction in 2019 was 84.44%.

For the July 2018 bar exam, ONU had a bar passage rate of 70.6%.

For the July 2017 bar exam, ONU had a bar passage rate of 86.7%.

Democratic Governance and Rule of Law LL.M.
ONU Law is home to the Democratic Governance and Rule of Law LL.M. program.  The program, founded in 2006, is a subsidized one-year program of study designed for lawyers practicing in the public or non-profit sector.  It is open to those whose first law degree was earned from a law school outside the U.S. as well as American lawyers interested in pursuing careers in the international development field.  Upon completion of the LL.M., foreign students are required to commit to 2 years further public service upon return to their home countries.  The unique curricular scope of the program covers topics relevant to lawyers, judges and public officials in transitioning states, including a strong focus on rule of law reforms. The LL.M. program was cut by the University in response for a need to lower costs. The final class of LL.M. students will graduate in May 2020, with the program ending following their graduation.

Employment
According to ONU Law's official ABA-required disclosures, 81% of the 2018 graduating class was employed in full-time professional positions 10 months after graduation (71% in bar passage required or JD advantage positions). Positions were in various size law firms, federal and local judicial clerkships, public interest, government, higher education, and businesses. The National Law Journal lists ONU Law as having one of the highest percentage of alumni, 38.1%, which are underemployed.

Costs
The cost of tuition at ONU Law for the 2019–20 academic year is $29,260.

Notable alumni

ONU Law alumni have gone on to become federal and state judges in 15 states, and to serve in the United States Senate and a Presidential cabinet. The Governor of Ohio is an alumnus.  Some notable alumni include:

 Warren Ballentine (b. 1973), Class of 2001, motivational speaker, and radio talk show host.
 Benjamin Brafman (b. 1948), Class of 1974; criminal defense attorney, attorney for former International Monetary Fund Head Dominique Strauss-Kahn and Harvey Weinstein. 
 William J. Brown (b. 1940), youngest Attorney General of Ohio.
 Anthony J. Celebrezze (1910–1998), Judge of the U.S. Court of Appeals for the Sixth Circuit; Secretary of U.S. Department of Health, Education and Welfare in the Kennedy and Johnson Administrations. 
 Ralph D. Cole (1873–1932), U.S. Representative from Ohio, brother of Raymond Clinton Cole. 
 Raymond Clinton Cole (1870-1957), Republican politician who became a U.S. Representative from Ohio and was the brother of Ralph Cole.  
 Mike Crites (b. 1948), Republican politician and former United States Attorney for the Southern District of Ohio. 
 Robert R. Cupp (b. 1950), Justice, Supreme Court of Ohio; Judge, Ohio Court of Appeals, 3rd Appellate District; State Senate, Ohio; Speaker, Ohio House. 
 Michael DeWine (b. 1947), U.S. Senator, Ohio from 1995 to 2007; former Attorney General of the State of Ohio. Governor of State of Ohio. 
 Jane M. Earll (b. 1958), Republican member of the Pennsylvania State Senate who has represented the 49th District since 1997. 
 James Espaldon (b. 1956), Guamanian politician and 2010 candidate for Lieutenant Governor of Guam.
 Simeon D. Fess (1861–1936), class of 1894; dean of ONU Law from 1896–1900; served as a U.S. Representative from Ohio and in the U.S. Senate from Ohio for twelve years. 
 Gregory L. Frost (b. 1949), Judge, U.S. District Court, Southern District of Ohio. 
 Stephanie L. Haines, (b.1969), U.S. Federal Judge, Western District of Pennsylvania
 Francey Hakes (b.1973), class of 1996; Asst. U.S. Attorney, first United States National Coordinator for Child Exploitation Prevention and Interdiction.  
 Robert Franklin Jones (1907–1968), class of 1929; a U.S. Representative from Ohio.
 Edward S. Matthias, justice of the Supreme Court of Ohio 
 Arthur W. Overmyer (1879–1952), a U.S. Representative from Ohio, and a judge on the Ohio Court of Appeals. 
 Homer A. Ramey (1891–1960), a U.S. Representative from Ohio. 
 Tom Reed (b. 1971); a U.S. Representative from New York; former mayor of Corning, New York. Co Chair of Problem Solvers Caucus in U.S. Congress. 
 Scott Rolle (b. 1961), class of 1987; State's Attorney for Frederick County, Maryland from 1995 to 2007. Judge of the Circuit Court for Frederick County, Maryland 2014–present. LTC, United States Army Reserve, 2001–present

References

External links
Ohio Northern University Pettit College of Law

Ohio Northern University
Law schools in Ohio
Educational institutions established in 1885
1885 establishments in Ohio